Lions in the Desert is a painting by Henry Ossawa Tanner, painted in 1897–98 during a visit to the Middle East.

References

Lions in art
1898 paintings
Paintings by Henry Ossawa Tanner